The Wingfeather Saga is a series of four fantasy novels, plus a "Creaturepedia" and a collection of side-stories titled The Wingfeather Tales, written by singer-songwriter Andrew Peterson, consisting of On the Edge of the Dark Sea of Darkness, North! Or Be Eaten, The Monster in the Hollows, and The Warden and the Wolf King. The series chronicles the adventures and transformations of a family called Igiby (grandfather Podo, mother Nia, and three children, Janner, Tink, and Leeli), as they discover secrets of their family history, flee the evil Fangs of Dang who are occupying the country of Skree where the Igibys were raised, seek their place in the world, and make a stand against the mysterious ruler behind the Fangs of Dang, Gnag the Nameless.

The series is being adapted into an animated television series by Angel Studios, with Peterson as a producer. Production of the show has been funded by equity crowdfunding.

Main characters

Janner Igiby (Wingfeather) 
Janner is the determined oldest brother. He sometimes helps shelving books in the bookstore and has a dream to sail. As the oldest, the ancient role of Throne Warden (protector of the king) belongs to him and places much pressure on his shoulders.

Tink (Kalmar) Igiby (Wingfeather) 
Tink (Kalmar, his birth name as mentioned early on in the book) is constantly hungry and ready for mischief with his brother, such as exploring in the nearby dangerous woods. He is later revealed to be heir to the throne by the Annieran tradition that the second son inherits the crown.

Leeli Igiby (Wingfeather) 
Leeli is kind, musically talented, and crippled, but is brave and can be surprisingly fast on her crutch when she has to be. She is gifted a Whistleharp, that is later revealed to have belonged to her great-grandmother, Madia, Queen of Anniera.

Nia Igiby (Wingfeather) 
Nia, mother to Janner, Tink and Leeli, and later revealed to be Queen of the Shining Isle of Anniera. After the Fangs took control she hid  herself and her children by returning to the town her father grew up in, and taking her mother's maiden name, Igiby.

Podo Helmer 
Podo is Nia's father. He tends the garden, protects the family, and tells stories of his former wild life as a pirate at sea. A dragon bit off his leg and he replaced it with a peg leg, often described as a stump.

Esben Wingfeather 
Janner, Kalmar, and Leeli's father, High King of the Shining Isle of Anniera.

Artham Wingfeather (Peet the Sock Man) 
Artham was Esben Wingfeather's older brother and the Throne Warden. At the start of the saga he is mad and wears socks on his hands. It is later reveal the socks conceal that his hands have been magically transformed to talons.

Sara Cobbler 
A friend of Janner who was taken by the Fangs to be a slave. When Janner is later enslaved she helps him escape and afterwards leads a mass escape of other slaves.

Animated series 
In March 2016 a Kickstarter was successfully funded to produce a pilot episode for an animated series adaptation. That campaign also funded a series of short stories set in the world of Aerwiar. The stories were written by Andrew Peterson, Jennifer Trafton, N.D. Wilson, A.S. Peterson, Jonathan Rogers, and Douglas Kaine McKelvey. They were illustrated by Cory Godbey, Nicholas Kole, John Hendrix, Joe Sutphin, Doug TenNapel, Justin Gerard, and Aedan Peterson; and the musical score was composed by The Arcadian Wild and Kurt Heinecke.

The fifteen-minute short film, titled A Crow for the Carriage, was premiered on November 2, 2017, at Belcourt Theatre in Nashville, Tennessee. The short is available for streaming on multiple platforms. The series' producer, J. Chris Wall, and author, Andrew Peterson, then tried to pitch the show to film and television outlets.

The show went through another round of crowdfunding with investment platform Angel Studios in May 2021. The campaign was able to raise $5 million in total, with $1 million being raised in the first 48 hours. This campaign raised enough money to fund the production of Season 1, which will cover most of the events of the first book. The first episode, Leeli and the Sea Dragon Song, released on December 2 on the Angel Studios app, YouTube, and Facebook. The second round of crowdfunding for season 2 began soon after with a planned release date of 2023. The series is being distributed by Angel Studios.

Season One 

1. Leeli and the Dragon Song – released December 2nd, 2022

2. A Mysterious Map – released December 16th, 2022

3. The Catacombs Below – released December 30th, 2022

4. Escape to Peet's Castle – released February 10th, 2023

5. Fruit for Zouzab – released February 24th, 2023

6. The Jewels of Anniera – released March 10th, 2023

External links

Notes and references

Fantasy novel series
2010s animated short films
Computer-animated short films
Christian novels